The 2019 ASEAN Grand Prix – First Leg was the first tournament of the 2019 ASEAN Grand Prix, an annual series of international women's volleyball tournaments contested by 4 national teams that are the members of the Southeast Asian Zonal Volleyball Association (SEAZVA), the sport's regional governing body affiliated to Asian Volleyball Confederation (AVC). Games were played at the Terminal 21 Korat, Nakhon Ratchasima, Thailand from 20 to 22 September 2019.

Teams
Four national teams featured in the 2019 ASEAN Grand Prix – First Leg.

Venue
The list of host city and venue was announced on September 20–22, 2019

Pool standing procedure
 Total number of victories (matches won, matched lost)
 In the event of a tie, the following first tiebreaker was to apply: The teams was to be ranked by the most point gained per match as follows:
Match won 3–0 or 3–1: 3 points for the winner, 0 points for the loser
Match won 3–2: 2 points for the winner, 1 point for the loser
Match forfeited: 3 points for the winner, 0 points (0–25, 0–25, 0–25) for the loser

Squads

League results
 All times are Thailand Standard Time (UTC+07:00).

|}

|}

Final standings

Awards
 Most Valuable Player
 Onuma Sittirak
 Best Spiker
 Chatchu-on Moksri
 Best Server
 Megawati Hangestri
 Best Blocker
 Mary Joy Baron
 Best Setter
 Tri Retno Mutiara Lutfi
 Best Libero
 Nguyễn Thị Kim Liên

See also
2019 ASEAN Grand Prix – Second Leg

References

Asean Grand Prix – First leg
Sport in Nakhon Ratchasima province